Eastern Star FC is a football club from Vientiane, Laos. It plays in the Lao League, the second level of Laotian football, after being  in the 2014 Lao League, due to a new format.

Sponsors

Players

External links
 Weltfussballarchiv

Football clubs in Laos